The 2015 FC Dallas season is the club's 20th season in existence in Major League Soccer, the top tier of the American soccer pyramid. Including the Dallas Tornado soccer franchise of the original NASL, this is the 35th season of professional soccer in Dallas. The season saw the team finish first in the Western Conference in the regular season for just the second time ever.

Background

Transfers

In

Out

Loan in

Loan out

Roster 
As of July 22, 2015.

Competitions

Match results

Preseason

Major League Soccer

League table

Western Conference standings
Western Conference

Overall standings

Results summary

Results by round

Regular season
Kickoff times are in CDT (UTC-05) unless shown otherwise

MLS Cup Playoffs

Western Conference Semifinals

Western Conference Finals

U.S. Open Cup 

FC Dallas entered the 2015 U.S. Open Cup with the rest of Major League Soccer in the fourth round.

Statistics

Appearances 

Numbers outside parentheses denote appearances as starter.
Numbers in parentheses denote appearances as substitute.
Players with no appearances are not included in the list.

Goals and assists

Disciplinary record

Kits

See also 
 FC Dallas
 2015 in American soccer
 2015 Major League Soccer season

References 

FC Dallas seasons
FC Dallas
FC Dallas
FC Dallas